Salvation Lassie Of Mine is a World War I song written by Jack Caddigan and Chick Story. The song was first published in 1919 by Leo Feist, Inc. in New York, NY. The sheet music cover features a photo of a Salvation Army nurse with soldiers entering a Salvation Army hut.
This song was in the top 20 charts in March and April 1919, reaching number 18 in April.

The sheet music can be found at the Pritzker Military Museum & Library.

References 

Bibliography
Parker, Bernard S. World War I Sheet Music Vol 2. Jefferson: McFarland & Company, Inc., 2007. . 
Paas, John Roger. 2014. America sings of war: American sheet music from World War I. . 
Vogel, Frederick G. World War I Songs: A History and Dictionary of Popular American Patriotic Tunes, with Over 300 Complete Lyrics. Jefferson: McFarland & Company, Inc., 1995. . 

1919 songs
Songs of World War I
Songs with lyrics by Jack Caddigan